The Pakistan Water & Power Development Authority (WAPDA) is a government-owned public utility maintaining power and water in Pakistan, although it does not manage thermal power. WAPDA includes Tarbela and Mangla dams among its resources. Its headquarters are in Lahore.

History
WAPDA was established by an act of parliament in 1958 to unify the maintenance of infrastructure previously overseen by provincial agencies. Its Chairmen included outstanding civil servants like Ghulam Ishaq Khan, Ghulam Faruque Khan and Aftab Ghulam Nabi Kazi who were subsequently President of Pakistan, Minister for Commerce and Economic Adviser, respectively. In October 2007, thermal power management was split into the newly formed Pakistan Electric Power Company (PEPCO).

WAPDA Water vision 2025

WAPDA has formulated a comprehensive $25–33 billion National Water Resource and Hydropower Development Programme, entitled Water Vision 2025. The Water Vision 2025 projects are expected to generate 16,000 MW of hydroelectricity. Other goals are to prevent water shortages, limit drought and increase water storage for a growing population. Five massive hydropower projects have been announced by the President of Pakistan; these are to be completed by 2016, with a generation capacity of 9,500 MW. Two of the projects are ready for construction, while three are in the stages of feasibility studies and preparation of tender documents.

Water Vision 2025 consists of three phases. Phase I was expected to start in 1993 but was delayed. The priority of water sector projects under Phase I of Water Vision 2025 are Gomal Dam (Khyber Pakhtunkhwa), Mirani Dam and Mithan Kot Barrage at Kachhi Canal (Balochistan) raising of Mangla Dam (Azad Kashmir), Greater Thal Canal phase I (Punjab) and Thar/ Rainee Canals phase I (Sindh). The total cost of these Phase I projects will be $2.467 billion with a construction period of five years. Under Phase II, Hingol Dam, Balochistan Dam and Satpara Dam (Northern Areas), Chashma Right Bank Canal and Kurram Tangi Dam (NWFP), phase II of the Greater Thal Canal Akhori Dam and Sanjwal Dam (Punjab), phase II of Thar/Rainee Canals, Gajnai and Sehwan Barrage (Sindh) will be completed in 3–6 years, except Bhasha Dam, which will take 8–10 years for its completion. The total cost of Phase II projects will be $8.94 billion. Under Phase III, Yugo Dam, Skardu Dam, Dhok Dam, Rohtas Dam, Naulong Dam and Khadji Dam will be completed and under phase IV Katzarah Dam will be completed.

Functions
Before the disbundling of its power wing WAPDA was the primary agency of Pakistan for the development of its water resources and electric power system. During its prime WAPDA was one of the biggest government-owned civilian institution in Pakistan. Since its inception in 1958 WAPDA has played a crucial role in the undersigned sectors and was the ultimate institution of the government of Pakistan for generation, transmission and distribution of power; Irrigation, water supply and drainage; Prevention of waterlogging and reclamation of waterlogged and saline lands; and Flood control. But after 2007 WAPDA’s mandate now is the development of water and hydropower resources in an efficient manner.

See also

 List of electric supply companies in Pakistan
 Electricity sector in Pakistan
 Economy of Pakistan
 Alternative Energy Development Board
 National Electric Power Regulatory Authority
 Karachi Electric Supply Company

References

Pakistan federal departments and agencies
Regulatory authorities of Pakistan
Water companies of Pakistan
Government-owned companies of Pakistan
Water supply and sanitation in Pakistan
Government agencies established in 1958
1958 establishments in Pakistan